Christian Weber (born 15 September 1983 in Saarbrücken, West Germany) is a German former professional footballer who could play as either a defender or a midfielder.

References

External links
 
 Christian Weber at kicker.de 

1983 births
Living people
Association football midfielders
Association football defenders
German footballers
Germany under-21 international footballers
MSV Duisburg players
1. FC Saarbrücken players
Athlitiki Enosi Larissa F.C. players
Fortuna Düsseldorf players
Bundesliga players
2. Bundesliga players
3. Liga players
Sportspeople from Saarbrücken